Oksana Khvostenko (born 27 November 1977 in Chernihiv) is a Ukrainian biathlete. She is a multiple medalist at the World Championships. In 2008 together with Andriy Deryzemlya she won World Team Challenge.

Anti-doping rule violation 
Khvostenko tested positive for ephedrine at a post event doping control at the Biathlon World Championships 2011 where the Ukrainian team had finished second in the Women's Relay. The team was later disqualified because of the anti-doping rule violation and Khyostenko received a one-year ban from sport, commencing on 13 March 2011.

Personal life
Since 2001, she is married to Ukrainian biathlete Vyacheslav Derkach.

Career 
 World Championships
 2003 - Silver medal on the relay
 2008 - Bronze medal, Sprint
 2008 - Bronze medal, Individual
 2008 - Silver medal on the relay

References

 
 

1977 births
Living people
Ukrainian female biathletes
Olympic biathletes of Ukraine
Biathletes at the 2002 Winter Olympics
Biathletes at the 2006 Winter Olympics
Biathletes at the 2010 Winter Olympics
Biathlon World Championships medalists
Universiade medalists in biathlon
Sportspeople from Chernihiv
Ukrainian sportspeople in doping cases
Doping cases in biathlon
Universiade bronze medalists for Ukraine
Competitors at the 1999 Winter Universiade
Competitors at the 2003 Winter Universiade
Competitors at the 2005 Winter Universiade